Miracle of the White Suit (Italian: Il grande giorno, Spanish: Un traje blanco) is a 1956 Italian-Spanish drama film directed by Rafael Gil and starring Miguel Gil, Miguel Ángel Rodríguez and Julia Martínez.

Plot 
The film recounts the tearful adventures of a poor boy when it comes to getting a white suit to make his first communion.

Cast

References

External links

Italian drama films
1956 drama films
Spanish drama films
Films directed by Rafael Gil
Lux Film films
1950s Spanish films
1950s Italian films
Italian black-and-white films
Spanish black-and-white films